Pipaliya Rani is a village in the Bhopal district of Madhya Pradesh, India. It is located in the Huzur tehsil and the Phanda block. The Kaliasot River and the National Highway 12 pass through the village.

Demographics 

According to the 2011 census of India, Pipaliya Rani has 65 households. The effective literacy rate (i.e. the literacy rate of population excluding children aged 6 and below) is 66.53%.

References 

Villages in Huzur tehsil